Teerasil Dangda (born 6 June 1988) is a Thai professional footballer who plays as a striker for Thai League club BG Pathum United. He also captains the Thailand national team.

Club career

Early career
Teerasil started his football career playing youth football for Assumption College Thonburi in 2003, aged 15. Two years later he left the club, due to the lack of a professional team (it was only founded in 2011).

In the 2004–2005 season, Teerasil joined Air Technical Training School in Thai Division 1 League In the same season he made his senior debut and scored three goals in only six matches for the club.

In 2006 Teerasil moved to Raj Pracha, being an important offensive unit for the side, being the club's topscorer (nine goals in 18 games) and also assisting in further five goals during the campaign.

In 2007 Teerasil joined fellow second divisioner Muangthong United, and was a part of the squad who was crowned champions, contributing with seven goals and six assists.

Manchester City
On 25 July 2007, Teerasil was taken on a trial at Manchester City (alongside Suree Sukha and Kiatprawut Saiwaeo), after Thai businessman and former Prime Minister Thaksin Shinawatra bought City earlier in the month. After a long time waiting for their work permits, the trio signed with City on 16 November.
 
However, after problems with the work permit, Teerasil was loaned to one of City's new alliances, Grasshopper. After returning to City in 2008, he was still unable to play in England, and after the takeover of Abu Dhabi United Group, the Thai trio was released on 16 October 2008. He later said that his time at City "made him a better footballer", despite not appearing with the first-team.

Grasshopper and return to Thailand
Teerasil was loaned to Grasshopper alongside Suree in November, but both failed to make a first-team appearance, only appearing with the reserves in 1. Liga Classic. He scored twice in six matches for the reserve squad  and returned to City in June 2008.

Soon after being released by City, Teerasil returned to his homeland and re-joined Raj Pracha for the remainder of the season. He contributed with six goals in only eight games, helping the club to achieve a mid-table position during the campaign.

Muangthong United

In 2009 Teerasil returned to Muangthong United. On 8 March 2009 he made his Thailand Premier League debut, in a 3–0 home win over Thai Port, and finished the season with seven goals under his belt. Muangthong was also champions of Thailand.

In 2010, Teerasil repeated his tally of the previous season, and was a part of the squad who was crowned champions of Thailand again. In 2011 he established himself as the club's topscorer, scoring 13 goals as Muangthong finished third. Teerasil was also invited for a trial at Queens Park Rangers in July.

In 2012, Muangthong engaged an unbeaten run which lasted the whole season, and Teerasil also scored four goals in a single match, an 8–1 routing over BBCU on 18 October. Ten days later he scored in a 2–2 draw against BEC Tero Sasana, a goal which granted the title, took his tally to 24 goals and broke the previous record of Ronnachai Sayomchai in 1998 (23 goals).

After his impressive goal tally in the season, Teerasil was invited by La Liga sides Atlético Madrid and Getafe CF for a trial, but as the former was a Muangthong partner, he headed to Atleti in January 2013; he also attracted interest of Trabzonspor in June.

On 9 January 2013 Teerasil travelled to Spain for a two-week trial at Atlético Madrid. He later described the Spanish football as "very quick, strong and with great quality", after completing his first training with the Madrilenians. Teerasil also watched from the stands an Atleti win over Real Zaragoza four days later, and returned to Muangthong in February.

Teerasil's first goal of the season came from a volley on 2 March 2013 in a 2–1 success against Army United. His second came late in the month, in a 3–0 home win over Songkhla United, and he scored again in the following weekend, against Ratchaburi. After seven matches without scoring, Teerasil netted again on 29 May, but in a 1–3 away loss to Suphanburi. On 23 June he netted twice against BEC Tero, and his first hat-trick of the season came on 5 October, in a 3–1 away win over Osotspa Saraburi.

Teerasil also played in the 2013 AFC Champions League group stage against Jeonbuk Hyundai Motors, Guangzhou Evergrande, and Urawa Red Diamonds. He finished the season with 16 goals in the league (21 overall).

Teerasil started 2014 season as a second striker, playing behind new signing Jay Bothroyd. He scored twice in the second game of the season, a 3–0 win at TOT, and again roughly a month later in a 4–1 success at PTT Rayong. Teerasil appeared in 18 league matches, scoring nine goals.

He played his last match for Muangthong on 2 July, starting in a 0–1 League Cup loss against Buriram United. Teerasil sent a farewell to Muangthong fans after the match.

Almería (loan)

On 21 February 2014, Teerasil signed with Almería on a one-year loan deal, making him the first Southeast Asian and Thai footballer to play in La Liga. He arrived at his new club on 9 June, being surrounded by supporters in the airport.

Teerasil made his debut in the Spanish top level on 23 August 2014, replacing Fernando Soriano in the 65th minute of a 1–1 home draw against RCD Espanyol, thus becoming the first Thai footballer to do so. He was handed his first start on 5 December, and scored his side's second of a 4–3 away win against Real Betis, for the campaign's Copa del Rey.

Return to Muangthong United
On 20 January 2015, after an unsuccessful spell, Teerasil returned to his parent club. He backed to be an important part for Muangthong United and won 2016 Thai League. In the next season, he scored 100th goal for his club on 11 March 2017 against Nakhon Ratchasima. Moreover, he broke Pipob On-Mo's league record of 108 goals becoming highest league goals of Thai players with 109 goals after scored twice against Super Power Samut Prakan.

Sanfrecce Hiroshima (loan)

Teerasil signed for Sanfrecce Hiroshima on 20 December 2017. He made his official debut against Consadole Sapporo, where his former teammates Chanathip Songkrasin and Jay Bothroyd also plays for, in 2018 J1 League and scored the winning goal for his club. He has scored 6 goals in 32 league appearances for the club. He returned to Muangthong United even though Sanfrecce want him to play in next season.

Shimizu S-Pulse
In January 2020 Teerasil signed with Shimizu S-Pulse. He made his debut on February 22 against FC Tokyo, netting a goal in a 3–1 defeat. In the 2020 J1 League, he scored 3 goals in 24 league appearances for the club.

BG Pathum United
In December 2020, Teerasil returned to the Thai League 1, signing with BG Pathum United F.C. On his debut 6 February, Teerasil scored his first goal for BG Pathum, in their 2–0 win against Police Tero. First season with BG Pathum he won the 2020–21 Thai League 1 title.	In 6 August 2022, BG Pathum United in a 3–2 win over Buriram United, he won the Thailand Champions Cup 2 times in a row.

International career

Teerasil appeared for Thailand's under-16 and under-17 squads in 2004, being a part of the squad which played at the 2004 AFC U-17 Championship. Two years later, he was also included in the under-19 squad which played at the 2006 AFC Youth Championship, scoring the first of two goals in the 2–1 win against the United Arab Emirates; it was Thailand's only victory of the tournament.

In 2007 Teerasil appeared for the under-23's. He was part of the Olympic team which failed to make the final cut ahead of 2008 Summer Olympics. In December 2007 he won the U-23 Gold Medal at the Southeast Asian Games, scoring the winner against Myanmar. In the same year Teerasil received his first call-up to the main squad, and was also into the 23-man squad ahead of 2007 AFC Asian Cup, being the youngest of the squad. However, he only appeared once in the whole tournament, coming on as a late substitute in a 1–1 draw against Iraq; the hosts subsequently failed to progress through the knockout stages, and finished third in Group A.

Teerasil was also selected to 2008 AFF Suzuki Cup; he netted four times during the tournament as Thailand finished runner-up, losing to Vietnam. Teerasil scored his side's first in the second leg, but Vietnam managed to score a last-minute goal and was crowned champions. He was an ever-present figure in the international fold since October 2007, his second match being a FIFA World Cup Qualifying against Macau, where he scored the second of a 6–1 win. He was a member of the victorious squad of 2008 T&T Cup at Vietnam.

In Asia's 2014 FIFA World Cup Qualifiers, under the management of a newly appointed German coach Winfried Schafer, Teerasil featured constantly and scored against Australia and Oman, respectively. He was the top scorer for the 2012 AFF Suzuki Cup, during which he scored a hat-trick against Myanmar.

Teerasil won and scored a penalty for Thailand against FC Barcelona in the Catalans' 2013 Asian Tour in Bangkok. In 2013, he was called up to the national team by Surachai Jaturapattarapong to the 2015 AFC Asian Cup qualification. In October 2013 Teerasil played a friendly match against Bahrain, and scored against Iran in the following match, a 1–2 loss at Tehran.

In May 2015, he played for Thailand in the 2018 FIFA World Cup qualification (AFC) against Vietnam. In June 2015, he scored twice in the 2018 FIFA World Cup qualification (AFC) against Chinese Taipei.

In 2021, Teerasil became the all-time top scorer for the AFF Championship with 19 goals, breaking Noh Alam Shah's 17 goal record, after scoring against the Philippines in the 2020 AFF Championship.

Style of play
Teerasil's style of play or role on the field could be described as a striker or deep-lying forward, as he often comes deep down to help the team maintain possession. Aside from his main position, he can play as the main reference upfront or as a midfielder (attacking midfielder or winger).

Teerasil has great quality on the ball and is also described as quick, skillful and with great vision, which as well as scoring allows him to make many assists for his teammates.

Personal life 
Teerasil was born in Bangkok with parents from Amphoe Sangkha, Surin province of Northeastern Thailand. His younger sister, Taneekarn, is a member of the Thailand women's national football team and also plays as a striker; his father was also a footballer and played for Royal Thai Air Force.

On 9 January 2016, he married his girlfriend Phusita Polrak. They have two children.

Career statistics

Club

International

International goals
Scores and results list Thailand's goal tally first.

Honours

Club
Muangthong United
 Thai League 1 (4): 2009, 2010, 2012, 2016
 Regional League Division 2 (1): 2007
 Kor Royal Cup (1): 2010
 Thai League Cup (2): 2016, 2017
 Thailand Champions Cup (1): 2017
 Mekong Club Championship (1): 2017

BG Pathum United
 Thai League 1 (1): 2020–21
 Thailand Champions Cup (2): 2021, 2022

International
 Thailand U-23
 SEA Games (1): 2007

Thailand
 AFF Championship (3): 2016, 2020, 2022 
King's Cup  (1): 2016

Individual
Goal.com readers' Asian Best XI of 2011
AFF Championship  overall top scorer with 25 goals
AFF Championship Top Scorer (5): 2008, 2012, 2016, 2020, 2022
AFF Championship Best XI (3): 2012, 2016, 2020, 2022
 ASEAN Football Federation Best XI: 2013, 2017
Thai Premier League Top Scorer (1): 2012
Thai Premier League Player of the Year (1): 2012

See also 
 List of men's footballers with 100 or more international caps
 List of men's footballers with 50 or more international goals

References

External links
 

1988 births
Living people
Teerasil Dangda
Teerasil Dangda
Association football forwards
Grasshopper Club Zürich players
Manchester City F.C. players
Teerasil Dangda
UD Almería players
Sanfrecce Hiroshima players
Shimizu S-Pulse players
Teerasil Dangda
La Liga players
J1 League players
Teerasil Dangda
Teerasil Dangda
Expatriate footballers in England
Expatriate footballers in Switzerland
Expatriate footballers in Spain
Expatriate footballers in Japan
Teerasil Dangda
Teerasil Dangda
Teerasil Dangda
Teerasil Dangda
Teerasil Dangda
2007 AFC Asian Cup players
Footballers at the 2010 Asian Games
2019 AFC Asian Cup players
Teerasil Dangda
Southeast Asian Games medalists in football
Competitors at the 2007 Southeast Asian Games
Teerasil Dangda
FIFA Century Club